"Got Ur Self a Gun" also known by "Got Ur Self A..." for the clean versions of the album and single respectively, is the second single from the 2001 album Stillmatic by the American rapper Nas. The song is produced by Megahertz and samples The Sopranos theme song "Woke Up This Morning", performed by Alabama 3. It reached #87 on the Billboard Hot 100.

Music video
The music video features Nas in a church confessional. It pays respect to The Notorious B.I.G. and 2Pac by depicting the two rappers being shot. The photos transition to video, in which Nas is the actor.

Single track listing

US 12" single

A-side
 "Got Ur Self a Gun" (Explicit)    
 "Got Ur Self A...." (Clean)

B-side
 "Got Ur Self a Gun" (Instrumental) 
 "You're da Man" (Explicit)

Europe 12" single

A-side
 "Got Ur Self a Gun" (Explicit)    
 "Black Zombie" (Explicit)

B-side
 "Ether" (Explicit)

Charts

Weekly charts

Year-end charts

References

2001 singles
Music videos directed by Benny Boom
Nas songs
Songs written by Nas
2001 songs
Columbia Records singles